Jenny Curtsdotter (born 16 January 1976) is a retired Swedish footballer. Curtsdotter was part of the Djurgården Swedish champions' team of 2003 and 2004. She was Swedish Women's Player of the Year in 2000.

Honours

Club 
 Djurgården/Älvsjö 
 Damallsvenskan (2): 2003, 2004

References

Swedish women's footballers
Djurgårdens IF Fotboll (women) players
1976 births
Living people
Women's association footballers not categorized by position